Carol Yuliana Lizarazo Antolinez (born 23 May 1993) is a Colombian professional tennis player.

On 5 January 2015, she reached her highest WTA singles ranking of No. 335 whilst her best doubles ranking was No. 124 on 6 March 2023. She has won one doubles title on the WTA Tour with ten singles titles and 16 doubles titles on the ITF Circuit.

Ranked No. 200, at a career high in doubles, she reached her first WTA final at the 2023 Monterrey Open partnering compatriot María Paulina Pérez García. They won their maiden title defeating Kimberly Birrell and Fernanda Contreras Gómez. As a result she moved up 75 positions in the doubles rankings into the top 125.

Playing for Colombia Fed Cup team, Lizarazo has a win–loss record of 10–11 (as of November 2022).

WTA career finals

Doubles: 1 (title)

ITF Circuit finals

Singles: 18 (10 titles, 8 runner–ups)

Doubles: 31 (16 titles, 15 runner–ups)

Notes

References

External links
 
 
 

1993 births
Living people
Colombian female tennis players
People from Cúcuta
Competitors at the 2010 South American Games
20th-century Colombian women
21st-century Colombian women